Prairie Farm is a village in Barron County in the U.S. state of Wisconsin. The population was 473 at the 2010 census. The village is located within the Town of Prairie Farm, on eastern shore of the Prairie Farm Flowage, a reservoir on the Hay River.

Geography
Prairie Farm is located at  (45.238443, -91.980591).

Prairie Farm is along County Roads A and F.

Demographics

2010 census
As of the census of 2010, there were 473 people, 201 households, and 114 families living in the village. The racial makeup of the village was 98.5% White, 0.2% Native American, 0.8% from other races, and 0.4% from two or more races. Hispanic or Latino of any race were 2.1% of the population.

There were 201 households, of which 26.9% had children under the age of 18 living with them, 43.3% were married couples living together, 8.5% had a female householder with no husband present, 5.0% had a male householder with no wife present, and 43.3% were non-families. 36.3% of all households were made up of individuals, and 16.9% had someone living alone who was 65 years of age or older. The average household size was 2.16 and the average family size was 2.83.

The median age in the village was 44.9 years. 21.1% of residents were under the age of 18; 5.2% were between the ages of 18 and 24; 24.1% were from 25 to 44; 26.2% were from 45 to 64; and 23.5% were 65 years of age or older. The gender makeup of the village was 45.9% male and 54.1% female.

2000 census
As of the census of 2000, there were 508 people, 199 households, and 119 families living in the village. The population density was 524.1 people per square mile (202.2/km2). There were 208 housing units at an average density of 214.6 per square mile (82.8/km2). The racial makeup of the village was 99.41% White, 0.39% Native American, and 0.20% from two or more races. Hispanic or Latino of any race were 3.15% of the population.

There were 199 households, out of which 27.6% had children under the age of 18 living with them, 50.3% were married couples living together, 5.5% had a female householder with no husband present, and 39.7% were non-families. 31.7% of all households were made up of individuals, and 17.6% had someone living alone who was 65 years of age or older. The average household size was 2.36 and the average family size was 3.03.

In the village, the population was spread out, with 22.2% under the age of 18, 6.9% from 18 to 24, 24.2% from 25 to 44, 23.4% from 45 to 64, and 23.2% who were 65 years of age or older. The median age was 42 years. For every 100 females, there were 92.4 males. For every 100 females age 18 and over, there were 89.9 males.

The median income for a household in the village was $38,000, and the median income for a family was $41,667. Males had a median income of $27,206 versus $21,917 for females. The per capita income for the village was $15,638. About 5.8% of families and 7.8% of the population were below the poverty line, including 3.6% of those under age 18 and 15.9% of those age 65 or over.

References

External links
 School District of Prairie Farm, Wisconsin

Villages in Wisconsin
Villages in Barron County, Wisconsin